Skidaway Island is unincorporated community on a barrier island of the same name in Chatham County, Georgia, United States. Located south of Savannah, Skidaway Island is known for its waterfront properties and golf courses within The Landings, one of the largest gated communities in the country. The population was 9,310 at the 2020 census. For statistical purposes, the United States Census Bureau has defined Skidaway Island as a census-designated place (CDP). A separate area of the island hosts the Skidaway Institute of Oceanography, a research institution operated by the University of Georgia. It receives scholars and researchers from several other Georgia universities as well, including Georgia Tech, Savannah State University, and the College of Coastal Georgia. Skidaway Island is part of the Savannah Metropolitan Statistical Area.

It is uncertain why the name "Skidaway" was applied to this island; the name may be derived from a word in Yamacraw or another Native American Creek language. In his 1967 publication How Georgia Got Her Names, Hal E. Brinkley stated that the name might be an Anglicized form of Scenawki, the wife of the Yamacraw chief Tomochichi, for whom Georgia's founder James Oglethorpe 
named the island.

In a March 2019 referendum, Skidaway Island voters overwhelmingly rejected a bill that would have incorporated their community as the City of Skidaway Island. The island remains unincorporated.

Geography

Skidaway Island is located at  (31.927434, -81.042505).

Demographics

2020 census

As of the 2020 United States census, there were 9,310 people, 4,272 households, and 3,014 families residing in the CDP.

2000 census
As of the census of 2000, there were 6,914 people, 3,193 households, and 2,701 families residing in the CDP. The racial makeup of the CDP was 97.57% White, 0.48% African American, 0.01% Native American, 1.37% Asian, 0.16% from other races, and 0.40% from two or more races. Hispanic or Latino of any race were 0.77% of the population.

There were 3,193 households, out of which 13.2% had children under the age of 18 living with them, 82.8% were married couples living together, 1.3% had a female householder with no husband present, and 15.4% were non-families. 14.2% of all households were made up of individuals, and 9.4% had someone living alone who was 65 years of age or older.  The average household size was 2.16 and the average family size was 2.35.

In the CDP, the population was spread out, with 11.2% under the age of 18, 2.0% from 18 to 24, 9.3% from 25 to 44, 38.1% from 45 to 64, and 39.3% who were 65 years of age or older.  The median age was 61 years. For every 100 females, there were 94.7 males.  For every 100 females age 18 and over, there were 93.6 males.

The median income for a household in the CDP was $96,395, and the median income for a family was $107,013. Males had a median income of $80,486 versus $42,188 for females. The per capita income for the CDP was $63,851 (the highest in the state).  About 0.7% of families and 1.3% of the population were below the poverty line, including none of those under age 18 and 0.3% of those age 65 or over.

Notable people
 Dorothea Orem, nursing theorist, who died at her home on Skidaway Island on June 22, 2007.
 Ron Senkowski, founder of Farmer's Almanac TV. 
 Bobby Thomson, baseball player, who died at his home there on August 16, 2010.

See also
 Skidaway Island State Park

References

External links
Skidaway Institute of Oceanography in New Georgia Encyclopedia
Skidaway Island Weather Center: Live Weather Station on Skidaway Island

Census-designated places in Chatham County, Georgia
Census-designated places in Georgia (U.S. state)
Savannah metropolitan area
Populated coastal places in Georgia (U.S. state)